Central Park is a 2017 American horror film written and directed by Justin Reinsilber and starring Ruby Modine, Grace Van Patten, Marina Squerciati and Michael Lombardi.

Cast
Justiin A. Davis as Harold Smith
Ruby Modine as Sessa
Malika Samuel as Donna
Guillermo Arribas as Felix
Grace Van Patten as Leyla
Deema Aitken as Mikey
Charles Borland as Max
Marina Squerciati as Melissa Shaw
Michael Lombardi as Daniel Shaw
Sarah Mezzanotte as Willa
David Valcin as Sam
Nicole Balsam as Officer Johnson
Justin Reinsilber as The Man

References

External links
 
 

American horror films
2010s English-language films
2010s American films